The Department of Tourism is one of the departments of the South African government. It is responsible for promoting and developing tourism, both from other countries to South Africa, and within South Africa..

The current political head of the department is the Minister of Tourism, Patricia de Lille who replaced Lindiwe Sisulu in 2023. In her capacity as Minister of Tourism she is responsible for South African Tourism, is the official national marketing agency of the South African government, with the goal of promoting Tourism in South Africa both locally and globally.

References

External links
 Official website

Tourism
South Africa